General elections were held in Italy on 6 November 1904, with a second round of voting on 13 November. The "ministerial" left-wing bloc remained the largest in Parliament, winning 339 of the 508 seats. The papal ban on Catholics voting was relaxed for the first time, and three Catholics were elected.

Background
After Giuseppe Saracco resignation as Prime Minister, Giuseppe Zanardelli was appointed as new head of the government; but he was unable to achieve much during his last term of office, as his health was greatly impaired. His Divorce Bill, although voted in the Chamber of Deputies, had to be withdrawn on account of the strong opposition of the country. He retired from the administration on 3 November 1903 and died on 26 December 1903.

The long-time liberal leader Giovanni Giolitti succeeded to Zanardelli. He courted the left and labour unions with social legislation, including subsidies for low-income housing, preferential government contracts for worker cooperatives, and old age and disability pensions. However, he, too, had to resort to strong measures in repressing some serious disorders in various parts of Italy, and thus he lost the favour of the Socialists.

Electoral system
The election was held using 508 single-member constituencies. However, prior to the election the electoral law was amended so that candidates needed only an absolute majority of votes to win their constituency, abolishing the second requirement of receiving the votes of at least one-sixth of registered voters.

Parties and leaders

Results

References

General elections in Italy
Italy
General
Italy